Wolf Laurel, North Carolina, is an unincorporated, private gated community, located in Madison and Yancey Counties of Western North Carolina. The unincorporated community is located approximately 30 miles north of Asheville, North Carolina, 6 miles from interstate 26 and borders the Cherokee National Forest, Tennessee state line and Appalachian Trail. It is named after Wolf Laurel Branch, which flows into Puncheon Fork after leaving the community upstream.

The community is composed mostly of summer and part-time residences, nestled within the valleys and perched on the slopes of the Walnut Mountains, at elevations ranging from 3500 to over 5500 feet in altitude. Located within the community are tennis courts and recreational center, a golf course and country club center, numerous hiking trails, and road access to the national forest lands and Appalachian Trail.

Skiers from around the southeast visit Wolf Laurel, primarily for the ski resort contained partly within the community boundary. Wolf Ridge Ski Resort is one of several in western North Carolina and still uses one of the last standing chairlifts, manufactured by Ski Lift International.

Due to the altitude and because of lying within a region which is subjected to a regular meteorological phenomenon known as Northwest Flow Snow Events (NWFS), the average annual snowfall is uncharacteristic of other areas this far south. During the winter months, the community is lightly resided, and mostly attended with visitors to the ski resort.

Unincorporated communities in Madison County, North Carolina
Unincorporated communities in Yancey County, North Carolina
Unincorporated communities in North Carolina